Jean-Claude Roy (born 1933) is a French film director, producer and screenwriter. He is sometimes credited as Patrick Aubin.

Selected filmography
 A Night at the Moulin Rouge (1957)
 Good Little Girls (1971)

References

Bibliography
 Peter Cowie & Derek Elley. World Filmography: 1967. Fairleigh Dickinson University Press, 1977.

External links

1933 births
Living people
People from Boulogne-Billancourt
French screenwriters
French film directors
French film producers
French pornographic film directors